William Grieve may refer to:

Percy Grieve (William Percival Grieve, 1915–1998), British politician
Bill Grieve (1900–1979), American baseball umpire
William Grieve (bridge) (1929–2017), American bridge player
William Robertson Grieve, Lord Grieve (1917–2005), Scottish law lord
William Grieve (painter) (1800–1844), English scene-painter

See also
William Greaves (disambiguation)
William Greive (1888–1916), Scottish cricketer and British Army soldier